Weaving Girl is a 2009 Chinese film directed by Wang Quan'an. Wang's fourth feature film, Weaving Girl stars Wang's frequent collaborator and former partner, actress Yu Nan.

Title
According to director Wang Quan'an, the film's title, Weaving Girl, is a reference to a Soviet worker's song that was popularized in China during the 1950s.

Reception
Weaving Girl won both the FIPRESCI prize and the Jury Grand Prize at the 2009 Montreal World Film Festival.

References

External links
Official site
 Official site

2009 drama films
2009 films
Films directed by Wang Quan'an
Films set in Xi'an
2000s Mandarin-language films
Chinese drama films